Sandpoint station is a train station along Amtrak's Empire Builder line in Sandpoint, Idaho, as well as the only operating Amtrak station in Idaho.  The station site is owned by BNSF Railway.

The station building is the oldest remaining active passenger depot of the former Northern Pacific Railway. It was listed on the National Register of Historic Places in 1973 and is known therein as the Sandpoint Burlington Northern Railroad Station, or as the Northern Pacific Depot.

In June 2009 Amtrak announced that it was considering a new stop in Sandpoint, citing concerns about the new Sand Creek Byway. City officials and the Idaho Department of Transportation (ITD) pledged additional funds to support retaining Amtrak service at the original depot.

As part of mitigation efforts related to construction of the byway, ITD paid BNSF approximately $922,000 to stabilize the depot or design and erect a replacement facility. As of winter 2013, Amtrak was working with station owner BNSF to modify the existing lease to include parts of the building and the platform. Once this process is completed, Amtrak will move forward with design work for the rehabilitation; in conjunction with this project, Amtrak will also fund a new ADA compliant concrete platform with tactile edging. In May 2015, the station was restored at a cost of $926,000 and featured a new roof with green tiles similar in appearance to the originals, and a refurbished waiting room.

References

External links 

Sandpoint Amtrak Station (USA Rail Guide -- Train Web)

Amtrak stations in Idaho
Former Northern Pacific Railway stations
Railway stations on the National Register of Historic Places in Idaho
Railway stations in the United States opened in 1916
Transportation in Bonner County, Idaho
National Register of Historic Places in Bonner County, Idaho